Sherkat-e Naft Chenar (also Romanized as Sherḵat-e Naft Chenār) is a village in Shurab Rural District, Veysian District, Dowreh County, Lorestan Province, Iran. At the 2006 census, its population was 342, in 77 families.

References 

Towns and villages in Dowreh County